Jesse Logan English (born September 13, 1984) is an American former professional baseball pitcher. He played for the Washington Nationals of Major League Baseball (MLB) in 2010, and for the EDA Rhinos of the Chinese Professional Baseball League (CPBL) in 2013.

Career
English played for the AZL Giants in 2002 and 2003. In 2002, he went 4-1 with a 2.68 ERA in 12 games started, striking out 68 batters in 47 innings. In 2003, he went 0-1 with a 3.98 ERA in seven games (six starts), striking out 31 batters in 20 innings. He played for the Hagerstown Suns in 2004, going 0-1 with a 7.48 ERA in 17 games (four starts). He missed all of 2005 due to injury, and in 2006 he went 3-0 with a 6.35 ERA in 17 relief appearances with the Salem-Keizer Volcanoes. He struck out 40 batters in 28 innings that season.

He split the 2007 season between the Volcanoes and San Jose Giants, going a combined 5-1 with a 1.31 ERA in 15 games. In 34 innings, he struck out 57 batters. In 2008, he played for the San Jose Giants, going 13-7 with a 3.19 ERA in 26 games started. He struck out 135 batters in 135 innings of work. He was claimed off waivers by the Washington Nationals on September 10, 2009.

Washington Nationals
Although he had never pitched above AA, he performed well enough to make the Nationals in spring training, and made his debut on April 5, 2010—opening day—against the Philadelphia Phillies, pitching 1.1 innings in an 11-1 loss.  After John Lannan was racked with seven hits, and issuing three walks, and allowing five runs in 3.2 innings, English entered the game with the bases loaded and slugger Ryan Howard at the plate.  Howard grounded out to end the inning, and English retired the side in order the following inning.

English pitched well in April, accumulating a 3.86 ERA, and holding left-handed hitters to a .188 batting average.  But injuries to position players forced the Nationals to call up position players, and so he was optioned to Triple-A Syracuse at the end of the month.

Cleveland Indians
English signed a minor league contract with the Cleveland Indians on March 24, 2011. He was subsequently assigned to the Short-Season-A Mahoning Valley Scrappers. English was released on June 3, 2011, prior to the start of the Scrappers' season.

St. Paul Saints
He pitched in August with St. Paul of the American Association. In 11 appearances, he went 0-1 with a 1.76 ERA with a save, striking out 19 over 15.1 innings.

Bridgeport Bluefish
He spent all of 2012 with Bridgeport of the Atlantic League. In 42 appearances, he went 3-0 with a 3.48 ERA, striking out 57 in 54.1 innings.

Broncos de Reynosa
He began 2013 with Reynosa of the Mexican League.

EDA Rhinos
He pitched in 25 games for Reynosa before signing with the EDA Rhinos of the Chinese Professional Baseball League. He appeared in only 2 games before being released.

Second stint with Bluefish
On July 15, he re-signed with Bridgeport.

Sioux City Explorers
English signed with the Sioux City Explorers of the American Association of Independent Professional Baseball and played for them during the 2014 season.

Post-playing career 
Jesse English is currently listed as baseball coach at Rancho Buena Vista High School in Vista, CA, where he graduated from.

References

External links

CPBL

1984 births
Living people
American expatriate baseball players in Mexico
American expatriate baseball players in Taiwan
Arizona League Giants players
Baseball coaches from California
Baseball players from California
Bridgeport Bluefish players
Broncos de Reynosa players
Connecticut Defenders players
EDA Rhinos players
Gulf Coast Nationals players
Hagerstown Suns players
Major League Baseball pitchers
Mexican League baseball pitchers
Salem-Keizer Volcanoes players
San Jose Giants players
Sioux City Explorers players
Sportspeople from Oceanside, California
St. Paul Saints players
Syracuse Chiefs players
Washington Nationals players